Ctenocardia is a genus of bivalves within the family Cardiidae. There are currently 6 species assigned to the genus.

Species 
 Ctenocardia fijianum 
 Ctenocardia fornicata 
 Ctenocardia gustavi 
 Ctenocardia pilbaraensis 
 Ctenocardia translata 
 Ctenocardia virgo

References 

Cardiidae
Bivalve genera